Loyat is a commune in the Morbihan department of Brittany in north-western France.

Geography

Historically it belongs to Upper Brittany. Before French Revolution, the parish belonged to Diocese of Saint-Malo.

Map

See also 
 Communes of the Morbihan department
 Olivier Delourme

References

External links

 Mayors of Morbihan Association 

Communes of Morbihan